The Bury and Thetford (Swaffham Branch), also known as the Crab and Winkle Line, was a railway line in England. It was formed of the Watton and Swaffham Railway, founded in 1866 as an independent venture by the Thetford and Watton Railway Company. Freight services commenced in January 1869, with passenger services in October 1869. The line ran from Thetford, via Watton to a junction with the Lynn and Dereham Railway at Swaffham and was completed in 1875.  The extension to Swaffham cost £72,000,

On 21 July 1879 the line was leased to the Great Eastern Railway for 999 years, commencing 1 March 1880. It was vested into the GER in 1897, becoming part of the London and North Eastern Railway on 1 January 1923.

The line was closed to passengers on 15 June 1964, with a two-car diesel multiple unit (DMU) driven by driver David Grant of Dereham operating the final service.  There were only 70 passengers on the final stage of the journey.  Roudham Junction to Watton was closed completely at this time, and the remainder was closed to freight on 19 April 1965, after transporting the final sugar beet and coal traffic.

Rolling stock
On opening, the railway was approached by Robert Fairlie, who wanted a line to test his "Fairlie Steam Carriage", but the railway company were not interested in this proposal.  Instead locomotives were obtained from Manning Wardle & Co.  These were 0-6-0 tank locomotives with 3-foot driving wheels and 11-inch cylinders.  The railway also secured a rebuilt 3 ft 6 in saddle tank. These locomotives were maintained at a shed at Watton.

Two more Manning Wardle tanks, and two Sharp, Stewart and Company 0-4-2 tender locomotives were added by September 1876.  The railway was taken over by the Great Eastern Railway in 1880, with the locomotives joining the GER stock list.  The Sharp locomotives being scrapped in 1891 and the tank engines in the late 1880s.

List of stations

 Swaffham - line and station closed.
 Holme Hale - line and station closed. 
 Watton - line and station closed.  
 Stow Bedon - line and station closed.  
 Wretham and Hockham - line and station closed.
 Roudham Junction railway station - line open, station closed.
 Thetford - line and station open.

The route today
The line was lifted after closure.  The route either side of Stow Bedon station has been removed, and the station site levelled.  The section of line between Stow Bedon and Wretham was intended to be used for a new road, and Stow Bedon station was demolished as part of this plan.  The road was not, however, constructed.  

Watton station has also been demolished and the site redeveloped, although a level crossing gate survived on Church Road as late as 1983.  The line from the junction with the Dereham line at Swaffham remains unobstructed, although with some bridges removed.  Holme Hale station remains as a private residence, complete with signal box and signal post - although heavily extended.

Loch Neaton
One of the ballast quarries created during the construction of the railway through Watton was converted into a leisure park and bathing lake known as Loch Neaton.  The area was named "Loch Neaton" in honour of the Scottish navvies who built the line, with Neaton being the local hamlet.  The park remains today, bordered on one side by the abandoned railway embankment.

Notes

References

 

Rail transport in Norfolk
Closed railway lines in the East of England
Railway companies established in 1866
Railway lines opened in 1869
Railway lines closed in 1964
1866 establishments in England
British companies established in 1866